José Valdes (born 10 April 1933) is a Guatemalan former swimmer. He competed in the men's 100 metre freestyle at the 1952 Summer Olympics.

References

1933 births
Living people
Guatemalan male swimmers
Olympic swimmers of Guatemala
Swimmers at the 1952 Summer Olympics
Place of birth missing (living people)